Steromphala umbilicalis, common name the flat top shell, is a species of sea snail, a marine gastropod mollusk in the family Trochidae, the top snails.

Description
The size of an adult shell varies between 10 mm and 22 mm. The shell is more depressed than Gibbula cineraria, and (although the base is flatter) never inclined to a pyramidal form. The spiral ridges are sharper and fewer, especially in the young. The coloring is different; both have a similar kind of marking, but in the present species the longitudinal rays or streaks are red, besides being broader and not half so many as in the other species. They are sometimes zigzag, instead of being broken into spots or interrupted by the sculpture.  This species is striped, the other lineated. Just within the outer lip are two borders, one of yellow, the other of green variegated by red spots. This edging is minutely tubercled like shagreen.

Distribution
This marine species occurs in European waters and in the Mediterranean Sea off Morocco. It is found from the upper shore into the sublittoral on sheltered rocky shores and is tolerant of emersion and brackish waters.

References

 Backeljau, T. (1986). Lijst van de recente mariene mollusken van België [List of the recent marine molluscs of Belgium]. Koninklijk Belgisch Instituut voor Natuurwetenschappen: Brussels, Belgium. 106 pp.
 Gofas, S.; Le Renard, J.; Bouchet, P. (2001). Mollusca, in: Costello, M.J. et al. (Ed.) (2001). European register of marine species: a check-list of the marine species in Europe and a bibliography of guides to their identification. Collection Patrimoines Naturels, 50: pp. 180–213
 Muller, Y. (2004). Faune et flore du littoral du Nord, du Pas-de-Calais et de la Belgique: inventaire. [Coastal fauna and flora of the Nord, Pas-de-Calais and Belgium: inventory]. Commission Régionale de Biologie Région Nord Pas-de-Calais: France. 307 pp

External links
 
 Da Costa E. M., 1778: Historia Naturalis Testaceorum Britanniae; London: Millan, White, Elmsley & Robson XII + 254 + VIII p., 17 pl 
 Montagu G., 1803: Testacea Britannica, or natural history of British shells, marine, land and the fresh-water, including the most minute: systematically arranged and embellished with figures; Romsey. London pp. XXXVII + 606 + 16 pl.
 [httpsGmelin J.F. (1791). Vermes. In: Gmelin J.F. (Ed.) Caroli a Linnaei Systema Naturae per Regna Tria Naturae, Ed. 13. Tome 1(6). G.E. Beer, Lipsiae [Leipzig]. pp. 3021-3910]://www.biodiversitylibrary.org/item/83098#5]
 Norman A. M., 1888: Museum Normanianum, or a catalogue of the Invertebrata of Europe, and the Arctic North Atlantic Oceans. IV Mollusca marina. V. Brachiopoda; Durham pp. 30
 Jeffreys J. G., 1862-1869: British Conchology; London, van Voorst Vol. 1: pp. CXIV + 341 [1862. Vol. 2: pp. 479 [1864]. Vol. 3: pp. 394 [1865]. Vol. 4: pp. 487 [1867]. Vol. 5: pp. 259 [1869] ]
 Pallary P., 1920: Exploration scientifique du Maroc organisée par la Société de Géographie de Paris et continuée par la Société des Sciences Naturelles du Maroc. Deuxième fascicule. Malacologie (1912) ; Larose, Rabat et Paris pp. 108, 1 pl., 1 map 
 ffenzeller S., Haar N. & Steiner G. (2017). Revision of the genus complex Gibbula: an integrative approach to delineating the Eastern Mediterranean genera Gibbula Risso, 1826, Steromphala Gray, 1847, and Phorcus Risso, 1826 using DNA-barcoding and geometric morphometrics (Vetigastropoda, Trochoidea). Organisms Diversity & Evolution. 17(4): 789-812

umbilicalis
Gastropods described in 1778